Evelyn May Boucher (15 March 1892–5 June 1991) was a British film actress who had a number of leading roles in silent films during the 1910s and 1920s appearing in films such as Tom Brown's Schooldays and The Man Who Bought London made at Catford Studios. She frequently worked with her husband the director Floyd Martin Thornton.

She was born at Steyning in West Sussex in 1892, the daughter of Edward James Boucher (1850–1933) and Susannah née Parris (1855–1933). In 1915 she married the American writer and director Floyd Martin Thornton at Steyning. They had two sons, both born in England: Edward E. Martin (1916–2010) and Paul Mulford Martin (1921–1994). In 1925 she, her husband and her sons left the UK for America, where they all remained for the rest of their lives.

She died in 1991 aged 99 at Costa Mesa in Orange County, California.

Selected filmography
 The Faith of a Child (1915)
 Tom Brown's Schooldays (1916)
 The Man Who Bought London (1916)
 Diana and Destiny (1916)
 If Thou Wert Blind (1917)
 The Happy Warrior (1917)
 Love's Old Sweet Song (1917)
 The Man Who Forgot (1919)
 The Knave of Hearts (1919)
 The Warrior Strain (1919)
 The Power of Right (1919)
 The Flame (1920)
 My Lord Conceit (1921)

References

Bibliography
Low, Rachel. The History of British Film: Volume IV, 1918–1929. Routledge, 1997.
 Warren, Patricia. British Film Studios: An Illustrated History. Batsford, 2001.

External links

1892 births
1991 deaths
British film actresses
English film actresses
English silent film actresses
20th-century English actresses
British expatriates in the United States